is a Nippon Professional Baseball player for the Hiroshima Toyo Carp in Japan's Central League.

External links

1980 births
Living people
Hiroshima Toyo Carp players
Japanese baseball coaches
Japanese baseball players
Nippon Professional Baseball coaches
Nippon Professional Baseball second basemen
Baseball people from Fukui Prefecture